Nabeel Kassis, also transliterated as Nabil Kassis, Nabil Qasis, Nabeel Qassis, etc., is a Palestinian academic and politician from Ramallah. He was born 1945.

Academic career
Kassis studied in Germany and Lebanon, earning a master's degree from the University of Mainz, and a PhD from the American University of Beirut, both in nuclear physics. He taught physics at a number of universities in Germany, Italy, France, England, Lebanon, and Jordan before joining Birzeit University in 1980. He served as President of Birzeit University from 2004 to 2010.

Diplomatic career
Kassis was a member of the Palestinian delegation to the Madrid Peace Conference in 1991, and a deputy head of the negotiation delegation at the Washington talks in 1992 to 1993. He later became the Director-General of the Technical and Advisory Committee to the Palestinian negotiation team, established to do preparatory work for the transition to Palestinian self-government. He was a member of the Palestinian delegation on final status negotiations in 1999.

Political career
As a proponent of transparency and reform, Kassis was appointed member of the Special Committee for the Investigation of the Auditor's Report in 1997. He later entered government as a political independent, serving as minister of state in 1998, Tourism Minister in 2002, Planning Minister from 2003 to 2005, and Finance Minister from 2012 to 2013.

References

1945 births
Academic staff of Birzeit University
Living people
Nuclear physicists
Palestinian scientists
Finance ministers of the Palestinian National Authority
Government ministers of the Palestinian National Authority
Johannes Gutenberg University Mainz alumni
American University of Beirut alumni
Members of the Palestinian Central Council
State ministers of Palestine
Government ministers of the State of Palestine